Erk Sens-Gorius (born 25 January 1946) is a German fencer. He won a gold medal in the team foil event at the 1976 Summer Olympics.

References

1946 births
Living people
German male fencers
Olympic fencers of West Germany
Fencers at the 1972 Summer Olympics
Fencers at the 1976 Summer Olympics
Olympic gold medalists for West Germany
Olympic medalists in fencing
Sportspeople from Hanover
Medalists at the 1976 Summer Olympics